These are the results for the voting for the National Soccer Hall of Fame 2009 induction class.  Jeff Agoos and Joy Fawcett were selected for the player category.

The Hall of Fame inducts individuals in three categories, Player, Veteran and Builder.  The Hall of Fame also selects individuals for special awards including the Colin Jose Media Award, Eddie Pearson Award and a Medal of Honor.

Player
To be eligible in this category, a player must have been retired at least three years and not more than ten.  Voting began on November 3, 2008 and ended December 3, 2008.  Any player who was named on at least 66.7% of the ballots cast was selected for induction.  Any player who received less than 5% of the ballots was dropped from the player eligibility list and will be placed on the Veterans eligibility list when they meet the criteria for that list.

On January 16, 2009, the Hall of Fame announced the results of the player ballot.  The announcement came on live television, a first for the Hall of Fame, broadcast from the annual NSCAA convention in St. Louis, Missouri.

Voting results
Voters cast 159 votes.  The balloting was tight with only two individuals exceeding the minimum of 66.7% required for induction.

Elected to the Hall of Fame:
 Jeff Agoos 67.9%
 Joy Fawcett 66.7%

Not elected but remaining on future ballots:

Eligible players
The following individuals were also declared eligible for induction in 2009, but were not among the top vote getters.

Veteran
On February 2, 2009, the Hall of Fame announced that none of the sixteen veteran candidates had received enough votes for induction into the hall.  The top five candidates are as follows:

The Veterans Screening Committee had selected the following sixteen candidates from a pool of over 300 eligible players.

Builder
On February 2, 2009, the Hall of Fame announced that none of the sixteen builder candidates had received enough votes for induction into the hall.  The top five candidates are as follows:

The Builder's Screening Committee had selected the following fifteen candidates from a list of over 50 eligible candidates.

External links
 2009 Eligibility List

National Soccer Hall of Fame Induction Class
National Soccer Hall of Fame Induction Classes